Tahoe Joe's is a chain of three steakhouse restaurants based in the Central Valley of California. The first restaurant opened in Fresno in 1995 by Dave Fansler with restaurants in Roseville and Folsom opening in 2002 (both since closed). In May 2008, Tahoe Joe's parent company, Buffets, Inc. (now Ovation Brands) was undergoing bankruptcy and tried to sell the Tahoe Joe's chain. The original Tahoe Joe's restaurant in Fresno closed in September 2016.

Critical acclaim
Tahoe Joe's has received an 8 ranking from 10best.  Additionally, Tahoe Joe's has been noted at The Consumerist for making amends for a wedding banquet gone wrong.

References

External links
 

1995 establishments in California
Companies based in Fresno, California
Restaurant chains in the United States
Restaurants established in 1995
Steakhouses in the United States
Companies that filed for Chapter 11 bankruptcy in 2008
Companies that filed for Chapter 11 bankruptcy in 2012
Companies that filed for Chapter 11 bankruptcy in 2016
Companies that filed for Chapter 11 bankruptcy in 2021